The Saint Marys Falls Hydropower Plant is an 18-MW hydroelectric generating plant located in Sault Ste. Marie, Michigan (the "Soo").  It extracts water from the St. Marys River under the supervision of the Army Corps of Engineers, and the power is taken up and distributed by the Cloverland Electric Cooperative, a rural utility that serves the Soo area.

History
As of 2021, the Soo hydropower plant is one of the oldest large generating stations still operating in the United States.  The power canal and generator complex were begun in September 1898 and completed in June 1902, using engineering work from the first iteration of large-scale electrical generation in the late 1800s.  It was from this work that the plant and utility that grew up around it acquired their historic name of Edison Sault, although Thomas Edison did not himself build the plant.

The Soo hydropower plant was built to contain 74 generators under a single roof. The sandstone facing of the power station was chiseled out of blocks pulled from the Edison Sault Power Canal, the feeder canal that chutes water to the plant. President William Howard Taft visited the plant in 1911. The power canal and hydroelectric plant were together named a Historic Civil Engineering Landmark in 1983.

Although the hydroelectric plant could generate as much as 25-30 megawatts if operating at full capacity, grid planners rate it at 18 MW.

References

External links

Dams in Michigan
1902 establishments in Michigan
Buildings and structures in Chippewa County, Michigan
Energy infrastructure completed in 1902
Historic American Engineering Record in Michigan
Historic Civil Engineering Landmarks
Historic Mechanical Engineering Landmarks
Hydroelectric power plants in Michigan
St. Marys River (Michigan–Ontario)